The Danish Timber, Industry, and Construction Workers' Union (TIB) was a trade union representing construction, wood and furniture workers in Denmark.

The union was founded in 1997, when the Danish Union of Joiners and Carpenters merged with the Danish Woodworkers' Union.  On formation, it had 71,572 members, around one-third of whom worked in construction, with the remainder in the wood, furniture and related industries.  Like its predecessors, it affiliated to the Danish Confederation of Trade Unions.

On 1 January 2011, the union merged into the United Federation of Danish Workers.

Presidents
1997: Arne Johansen
2008: Johnny Skovengaard

References

External links

Danish Confederation of Trade Unions
Building and construction trade unions
Trade unions in Denmark
Organizations based in Copenhagen
Trade unions established in 1997
Trade unions disestablished in 2010